Pathius is a genus of leaf beetles in the subfamily Eumolpinae. It is known from Africa and the Arabian Peninsula.

The genus was originally named Taphius by Martin Jacoby in 1897; however, this name was preoccupied by Taphius Adams, 1855 (a genus in Mollusca, currently a synonym of Biomphalaria Preston, 1910) and Taphius Rafinesque, 1815 (a nomen nudum genus in Crustacea), so it was renamed to Pathius by N. A. Aslam in 1968.

Species
 Pathius daccordii Zoia, 2020
 Pathius flavus (Jacoby, 1897)
 Pathius maculatus (Bryant, 1957)
 Pathius major (Weise, 1912)
 Pathius pallidus (Weise, 1912)
 Pathius pici Zoia, 2019
 Pathius tanganikanus (Burgeon, 1941)
 Pathius variabilis (Selman, 1963)
 Pathius vulgaris (Chapuis, 1879) (Phascus?)

References

Eumolpinae
Chrysomelidae genera
Beetles of Africa
Beetles of Asia